The Phoenix Roadrunners are a defunct minor professional ice hockey team that was based in Phoenix, Arizona. Established in 1977, the team played the 1977–78 and 1978–79 seasons in the Pacific Hockey League. Coached by Sandy Hucul, the team played its home games out of the Arizona Veterans Memorial Coliseum.

References

Defunct ice hockey teams in the United States
Ice hockey clubs established in 1977
Ice hockey clubs disestablished in 1979
1977 establishments in Arizona
1979 disestablishments in Arizona
Ice hockey teams in Arizona